Events in the year 1798 in Norway.

Incumbents
Monarch: Christian VII

Events
18 July - The town of Egersund is founded.

Arts and literature

Births
10 February - Niels Nielsen Vogt, priest and politician (d.1869)
17 July - Aslak Reiersen Midhassel, politician (d.1882)
25 August - Christian Halvorsen Svenkerud, politician (d.1886)
8 October - Hans Holmboe, educator and politician (d.1868)
14 November - Peder Carl Lasson, jurist and politician (d.1873)

Full date unknown
Christian Peder Bianco Boeck, doctor, zoologist and mountaineer (d.1877)
Harald Kolbeinson Guddal, politician (d.1887)
Nils Isachsen Kulstad, politician
Ole Ingebrigtsen Soelberg, politician (d.1874)
Lars Bastian Ridder Stabell, politician (d.1860)

Deaths

See also